Bird's Grass is a studio album by trumpeter Idrees Sulieman recorded in 1976 but not released on the SteepleChase label until 1985.

Reception

Scott Yanow of AllMusic reviewed the album, stating "Excellent music with plenty of colorful solos".

Track listing 
 "Wee" (Denzil Best)4:57
 "The Summer Knows" (Alan and Marilyn Bergman, Michel Legrand)6:27
 "Billie's Bounce" (Charlie Parker)12:35
 "Loneliness Is a Mutual Feeling" take 1 (Per Goldschmidt)10:36  Bonus track on CD reissue
 "All Your Words" (Sulieman)10:14
 "Loneliness Is a Mutual Feeling" (Goldschmidt)11:07

Personnel 
Idrees Suliemantrumpet, flugelhorn
Per Goldschmidttenor saxophone
Horace Parlanpiano
Niels-Henning Ørsted Pedersenbass
Kenny Clarkedrums

References 

Idrees Sulieman albums
1985 albums
SteepleChase Records albums